The John Tyler Morgan House is a historic Greek Revival-style house in Selma, Alabama, United States.  It was built by Thomas R. Wetmore in 1859 and sold to John Tyler Morgan in 1865.  Morgan was an attorney and former Confederate general.  Beginning in 1876, he was elected as a Democratic U.S. senator from Alabama for six terms.  He used this house as his primary residence for many of those years.

The building housed John T. Morgan Academy from its incorporation in June 1965 until a new campus was completed in 1967.  The house was added to the National Register of Historic Places on September 27, 1972, due to its historical significance.  It currently houses the Alabama Historical Commission's Old Cahawba Administrative Offices.

References

External links

Houses on the National Register of Historic Places in Alabama
National Register of Historic Places in Dallas County, Alabama
Houses completed in 1859
Greek Revival houses in Alabama
Buildings and structures in Selma, Alabama
Houses in Dallas County, Alabama
Historic American Buildings Survey in Alabama